

A moored training ship (MTS) is a United States Navy nuclear powered submarine that has been converted to a training ship for the Naval Nuclear Power Training Command's Nuclear Power Training Unit (NPTU) at Naval Support Activity Charleston in South Carolina. The NPTU is part of the Navy's Nuclear Power School at Goose Creek, S.C. The Navy uses decommissioned nuclear submarines and converts them to MTSs to train personnel in the operation and maintenance of submarines and their nuclear reactors. Conversion of these two boats took place at the Charleston Naval Shipyard and modifications included special mooring arrangements with a mechanism to absorb power generated by the main propulsion shaft.

The conversions for these two will take place at the Norfolk Naval Shipyard and they will then be taken to NSA Charleston. La Jolla became inactive in early 2015 and began the 32 month conversion to a training ship. Changes include having the hull cut into three sections, with the center section being recycled and the other two joined with three new sections, manufactured by Electric Boat, extending the overall length by 23 m (76 ft). The project was expected to be completed by the end of 2018. San Francisco arrived at Norfolk to begin her conversion in January 2018.

With the addition of La Jolla and San Francisco, the Navy will retire Sam Rayburn and Daniel Webster. Sam Rayburn will be relocate to Norfolk Naval Shipyard in 2021, to remain there until the inactivation process begins, and Daniel Webster will also be inactivated at Norfolk, sometime later.

Moored training ships

See also

 United States Navy Nuclear Propulsion
 Nuclear marine propulsion
 United States naval reactors
 List of United States Naval reactors
 Hulk (ship type)

References

External links
 
 

United States Navy
Nuclear technology
Nuclear organizations
United States Navy schools and training
Education in Goose Creek, South Carolina